Gambian cuisine is part of West African cuisine and includes the culinary practices and traditions of the nation of The Gambia. Common ingredients include fish, rice, peanuts, tomato, black-eyed peas, lemon, cassava, cabbage, salt, pepper, onion, chili, and various herbs. Oysters are also a popular food from the River Gambia, and are harvested by women.

Dishes

 Benachin is a Gambian dish traditionally cooked in one pot (the practice giving it its name). Various ingredients including fish or meat are added, seasoned with herbs, lemon juice, basil, aubergine, parsley, onion, chili, tomato, pumpkin, carrot, cabbage, vegetable oil, and water, with tomato paste sometimes added for color
 Caldo is a lemon-flavored steamed whole-fish dish, a variation of yassa. Jorto or sompat are usually used
 Domoda, a Mandinka dish made with concentrated peanut paste, meat or fish seasoned with salt, medium onion, fresh tomatoes, potatoes, carrots, medium cabbage, water, tomato paste, lemon juice, soup stock, and white rice. Domo means eating and Da is the word for a stew pot
 Mbahal or Nyankatang a smoked and salted fish dish prepared with groundnuts, locust bean or black-eyed beans, spring onion, fresh chilies, white rice, and bitter tomato or jattoo
 Nyambeh nyebbeh, a cassava and bean dish made with oils, onion, chili, soup stock, salt, pepper, water and fried snapper
 Peppersoup, a spicy fish stew.
 Yassa is a lemon whole-chicken or fish dish made with salt, pepper, onion, clove, garlic, mustard, chili sauce, lime juice, rice and water (if making it with chicken)
 Fish balls made with ground bonga, onion, tomato, breadcrumbs, parsley, black pepper, oil, soup stock, tomato paste, chilis and white rice
 Maafe a Mandinka dish made from peanut paste and various vegetables.
 Oyster stew
 Thiakry, a sweet dish made from couscous (wheat or millet), milk (or sweetened condensed milk or yogurt), and spices; chakery is a couscous pudding

References

 Ghanaian Dishes
 Nigerian Dishes 
 West African Dishes

 
West African cuisine